Ifeanyi Chukwuebuka Ibegbunam  known professionally as Fecko (previously Fecko the Emcee), is a Nigerian hip hop artist and emcee. He is the winner of The Mic Africa season 1 and the first Nigerian rapper to perform in the metaverse. His name stands for "Formidable Emcees Can Knockout Obstacles".

Early life and education 
Born in Anambra, Nigeria and grew up in the suburbs of Lagos, Mushin. Fecko is a graduate of Environmental Biology from Yaba College of Technology.

Career 
Fecko started his musical career professionally in 2006 when he recorded his debut album which was not officially released on streaming platforms. He has worked with M.I Abaga, The Lady Of Rage, Doug E Fresh, Mode 9, and Khaligraph Jones. His Extended play, "Afrobeat, Rhythm and Truth" was soundtracked on Afrocity show, a limited web series by Ndani TV.

Critical reception 
OkayAfrica called "Flow Global" by Fecko a Fela Kuti inspired production.

Discography

Albums 

 Afrobeat, Rhythm & Truth (2016)

Singles

As featured artist

References

External links 

 Fecko at AllMusic

Living people
1989 births
Nigerian hip hop musicians